The 1974 Oran Park 100, one of three races marketed as the Peter Stuyvesant $100,000 was the fifth round of the 1974 Tasman Series. It was open to racing cars complying with the Tasman Formula, which permitted Formula 5000-style cars and 2-litre cars. The race and was held at Oran Park Raceway on 3 February 1974.

It was held on the same circuit that would in November be used for the Australian Grand Prix. Australian driver Max Stewart won the race and would go on to win the Grand Prix as well.

Classification

Notes

References

Tasman Series
Oran Park 100
Formula 5000 race reports